Rajendra Arlekar is an Indian statesman who is current and 31st Governor of Bihar. He previously served as the  21st Governor of Himachal Pradesh, being the first person serving as the Governor of Himachal Pradesh from Goa. He was a Cabinet Minister in the Government of Goa and a former speaker of the Goa Legislative Assembly. He is a leader of Bharatiya Janata Party.

Political career
Arlekar has been associated with the Rashtriya Swayamsevak Sangh since his childhood. He joined the Bharatiya Janata Party in 1989.
He has been an active member of the Goa BJP since the 1980s. He has held various positions which include the following:
General Secretary, Bharatiya Janata Party, Goa Pradesh.
Chairman, Goa Industrial Development Corporation.
Chairman, Goa State Scheduled Castes and Other Backward Classes Financial Development Corporation.
General Secretary, Bharatiya Janata Party, Goa.
South Goa President, Bharatiya Janata Party.

When Manohar Parrikar was roped in as the Union Defence Minister in 2014, Arlekar was considered for the next Chief Minister but the Party chose Laxmikant Parsekar as the next Chief Minister instead.

He is credited with making Goa Legislative Assembly paperless, the first state assembly to do so.

In 2015 he was appointed the Minister for Environment and Forests during the reshuffling of the cabinet.

On 6 July 2021 he was appointed Himachal Pradesh Governor when the incumbent Bandaru Dattatreya was made the governor of Haryana. Arlekar thanked the Party and stated that BJP is a Party where the work of each and every member is recognized.

References

|-

|-

|-

1954 births
Living people
Speakers of the Goa Legislative Assembly
People from Panaji
Members of the Goa Legislative Assembly
Bharatiya Janata Party politicians from Goa
Governors of Himachal Pradesh